Pandiya Naadu is a 2013 Indian Tamil-language action drama film written and directed by Suseenthiran and produced by Vishal. The film features Vishal and Lakshmi Menon in the lead roles, while Bharathiraja, Soori, Vikranth, and Sharath Lohitashwa play other pivotal roles. The film has music composed by D. Imman with cinematography by R. Madhi and editing by Anthony. The film released on 2 November 2013, coinciding with Diwali, receiving positive reviews. It was dubbed in Hindi as Shiva Ka Badla. The film was remade in Kannada as Rudra Tandava with Chiranjeevi Sarja.

Plot 
Sivakumar is a meek person who owns a mobile sales and service center in Madurai with his friend and sidekick Ganesan. He falls in love with his father's tenant Malarvizhi Chidambaram. His father Kalyanasundaram , a retired government employee, shows much care on Siva's elder brother Nagarajan, an honest government officer. Meanwhile, there is a big mafia gang led by Simmakkal Ravi, who rules Madurai with an iron fist. Sethu, a friend of Siva, helps him woo Malar by beating up men who were harassing her. Later, Sethu also helps his ex-lover Amudha escape from Ravi's chief henchman Bharani, who was harassing her, by stabbing him in the stomach. Siva tells Sethu and Amudha to flee Madurai. Meanwhile, Nagaraj's wife becomes pregnant with their second child. Nagaraj confronts Ravi over the deaths of workers at his quarry, which is deeper than the legal limit, and shuts it down. An angered Ravi stages a road accident and kills Nagaraj. At the hospital, a frightened Kalyanasundaram is threatened by Ravi's men to keep quiet about the incident and they forge Kalyanasudaram's signature for a document stating that Nagarajan was driving under the influence, and the father discovers that Ravi killed Nagaraj. Later, Siva confides to Ganesan that he had discovered the truth about Nagarajan's death. The grieving Siva and Kalyanasundaram draw up separate plans to eliminate Ravi, without each other's knowledge. Kalyanasundaram pays ₹3,000,000 ($50,000) to a prisoner to organize a hit squad, while Siva, through Ganesan, gives Ravi and his assistant hacked smartphones so as to track their calls, and monitors Ravi's activities closely for a year, biding his time for the right moment. Siva plans to kill Ravi when he visits Coonoor to meet a minister friend of his. However, as he prepares to attack, the hit squad attacks Ravi in the same spot. As Ravi fights back, Siva runs in to try and kill Ravi but is seen masked by Bharani. Ravi kills all of the hit squad members and finds out who hired them. In the meantime, Siva gets engaged to Malar. Ravi forces the hit squad organizer to tell his client that he will return the money at a bus stand so they can capture and kill the person who tried to kill him. To retrieve his money, Kalyanasundaram goes to the bus stand and is chased after by Ravi's gang. He falls unconscious due to the health problems and is almost captured before a masked Siva rescues him from the goons and takes him to the hospital, without revealing to the staff that he is his son.

There, Siva and Ganesan, who had retrieved the money, weep after hearing Kalyanasundaram lament his failure to his advocate. Siva then continues to follow Ravi and makes a plan with Ganesan to kill him at a temple festival. Ravi, suspecting a member of the general public, has the police commissioner round up all male family members of civilians whom he had killed to discover the would-be killer. Siva learns that Ravi will be meeting in a theatre, and so Siva, against Ganesan's advice, goes to the theatre bathroom to kill Ravi. However, he is evicted by one of Ravi's men and leaves his sickle in the stall. Bharani, however, recognises Siva from their past encounters, while Ravi notices the sickle and chases Siva, who escapes. However, he meets Amudha, who tells him that after Siva told Sethu to leave, the police stopped him and handed him over to Ravi. Bharani killed Sethu right in front of Amudha. When Ravi's henchman corner them, a furious Siva manages to kill them all. An angered Bharani attacks Siva, only to be killed by Siva, thus avenging Sethu's death. When Ravi arrives and sees his dead men, Siva kills the last of them and attacks Ravi. After a tense and fierce fight, Ravi is seriously wounded. The police arrive at dawn, after Siva takes Ravi to a well and leaves him there to die, telling him that he represents all the innocent people whom Ravi has killed and that Ravi will watch himself die. Siva is then married to Malar. The news mentions how Ravi's partially-decomposed body is discovered after Siva gives an anonymous tip to the police. After Siva secretly tells his father his role in all the events, Kalyanasundaram embraces his son with joy and takes a walk with his grandson.

Cast 

Vishal as Sivakumar Kalyanasundaram, a mobile sales and service center owner
Bharathiraja as Kalyanasundaram, Siva's father
Lakshmi Menon as Malarvizhi Chidambaram, a schoolteacher and Siva's love interest
Soori as Ganesan/Doubt, Siva's friend
Sharath Lohitashwa as Simmakkal Ravi, a mafia gang leader
Harish Uthaman as Bharani, Ravi's chief henchman
Guru Somasundaram as Nagaraj, Siva's brother
Tulasi as Sivagami Chidambaram
Advaitha as Amudha, Sethu's ex-lover
V. I. S. Jayapalan as Ravi's advisor
Soumya Satish as Amudha Kalyanasundaram
Vazhakku En Muthuraman as Raasu
Baby Rakshana as Pooja
 Bava Lakshmanan
Vikranth as Sethu, Siva's friend (guest appearance)
Krishna Priya (cameo appearance)

Production 
In March 2013, Vishal announced that he is going to work with Suseenthiran in a film tipped to be a commercial action entertainer, and the crew will be more or less the same that worked in Suseenthiran's Naan Mahaan Alla, which was of the same genre. After that, Suseenthiran confirmed that Vishal will act and also produce this movie under his home banner Vishal Film Factory. After some days, they announced the title as Pandianadu and the cast and crew. Lakshmi Menon was selected to play the love interest of Vishal, and D. Imman was signed to score the music. Vikranth was cast in a pivotal role along with Soori and Aaranya Kaandam fame Guru Somasundaram. Bharathiraja was signed to play Vishal's father in the film. Shooting started on 15 May 2013 in parts of Madurai, Virudhunagar, Coonoor, Pollachi and Tiruchirappalli. The major shooting took place in Virudhunagar for nearly 20 days. Further action plots were taken in the town. It was the third film to be shot in Virudhunagar, after Veyil and Renigunta. The film was said to be shot in 4K resolution, making it the second Tamil film after Sivaji.

Soundtrack 

The soundtrack for Pandiya Naadu was composed by D. Imman collaborating with Suseenthiran and Vishal, for the first time. The audio rights were acquired by Think Music. A single track "Othakada Othakada Machaan" was released on 22 September 2013, at the cultural event held at Loyola Engineering College in Chennai. The audio was launched on 13 October 2013, at Sathyam Cinemas in Chennai, with the presence of the film's cast and crew.

Behindwoods gave 2.75 out of 5 to the album stating "Trademark Imman sounds packed with some amount of punch." Indiaglitz gave 3 out of 5 and stated "Imman score again."

Release 
The satellite rights of the film were secured by Raj TV for 10 crore, though Vishal's films were generally brought for 6–7 crore as an average. The film was initially given a U/A certificate by the Indian Censor Board, but later it was given a U certificate. Pandiya Naadu released on 2 November alongside Aarambam and All in All Azhagu Raja. It released in 350+ screens in Tamil Nadu , while overseas it released in 70 screens adding up to 1000+ screens worldwide. The film was released in 80 screens in Kerala on 8 November 2013.

Reception

Critical reception 
The film received positive reviews. Rediff gave 3.5 stars out of 5 and said "What makes Pandianadu remarkable is the director’s realistic approach and the right amount of commercialism supported by a well-written script, good dialogues, great music and excellent all–round performances". Sify wrote, "The jaded revenge formula in commercial cinema is reinvented by Suseenthiran with Pandiya Nadu. The story is the tried and tested revenge theme, but the impact it is able to create is terrific. The film keeps you hooked till the end due to Suseenthiran’s script, fabulous performances from the lead actors and believability factor". IANS wrote, "Pandiya Naadu unarguably is a better film compared to other two Diwali releases. It's a quintessential revenge drama supported by taut narration and wonderful performances. The film is a winner because of Suseenthiran, who knows exactly how to use his craft and never let goes off an opportunity to pleasantly surprise the audience".  Indiaglitz rated 3/5. Behindwoods gave 3.25 out of 5 stars and wrote, "Pandianadu is a well written commercial film backed by remarkable performances and lives up to its dark-horse label prior to its release". Cinemaead gave 3.5 out of 5 stars and wrote, " Pandianadu is the perfect diwali outing and it is an edge of the seat entertainer which engages you from the start till the end.".

Times of AP rated 3.5/5 and stated "Edge of the seat revenge action thriller". Rohit Penumatsa rated 3.5/5 and stated "tightly scripted and has some of the best action sequences in recent times". Sulekha.com rates 3/5 and states "Suseenthiran has played it to Vishal's strength. Pandiyaa Naadu makes it big thanks to the package".

Baradwaj Rangan of the Hindu wrote "Suseenthiran stages the genre staples well enough — the fight in a bus station; the suspense around an assassination attempt in a theatre — but what he does around these generic scenarios is this movie’s secret strength. That’s what shows that he’s no... ordinary filmmaker."

The film also received positive feedback from fans as well.

Box office 
On first day, the film opened to packed house and grossed 7.14 crore in its first day. The film collected ₹38.12 lakh from 156 shows in its opening weekend in Chennai and opened behind the other releases Arrambam and All in All Azhagu Raja. After seven weeks, the total collections at the Chennai box office were estimated at ₹3.81 crores and the film was termed a Super hit by Behindwoods.com. The film collected 52.35 crore in its full run at the box office. The film grossed 50 crore at the box office in its final run.

Awards and nominations 
Vijay Awards
 Best Supporting Actor – Bharathiraja, Won
 Best Editor – Anthony, Won
 Best Stunt Director – Anal Arasu, Won
 Best Actor – Vishal, Nominated
 Best Director – Suseenthiran, Nominated
 Best Villain – Sharath Lohitashwa, Nominated
 Best Art Director – Rajeevan, Nominated
 Best Dialogue Writer – Suseenthiran and Baskar Shakthi, Nominated

SIIMA Awards
 Best Debutant Producer – Vishal, Won
 Best Fight Choreographer – Anal Arasu, Won
 Best Actor – Vishal, Nominated
 Best Director – Suseenthiran, Nominated
 Best Supporting Actor – Bharathiraja, Nominated
 Best Actor in a Negative Role – Sharath Lohitashwa, Nominated
 Best Female Playback Singer – Remya Nambeesan For Fy Fy Fy, Nominated

References

External links 
 

2013 films
Films shot in Tiruchirappalli
Films shot in Madurai
Films directed by Suseenthiran
Indian films about revenge
Tamil films remade in other languages
2010s Tamil-language films
Films scored by D. Imman
Indian action drama films
2013 action drama films